De Garengeot's hernia is a rare subtype of an incarcerated femoral hernia. This eponym may be used to describe the incarceration of the vermiform appendix within a femoral hernia.

Akopian and Alexander, named this hernia after the 18th century Parisian surgeon Rene Jacques Croissant de Garengeot. He is quoted in the surgical literature as the first to describe this situation in 1731. (Although the surgeon's full last name is Croissant de Garengeot, for linguistic convenience it has been suggested to abbreviate this eponym to "de Garengeot".)

Similar as with the situation of an Amyand's hernia, the true nature of the incarcerated tissue is rarely diagnosed preoperatively. Patients present clinically similar to other incarcerated femoral herniae. Treatment consists of an appendectomy and hernia repair. Laparoscopic options are described.

References

External links
 De Garengeot's Hernia a case report from Case Western Reserve University
 Gillion JF, Bornet G, Hamrouni A, Jullès MC, Convard JP (2007). Amyand and de Garengeot’ hernias. Hernia 11(3):289–290

Hernias